The Motor City Open is an annual international squash championship held in Bloomfield Hills, Michigan. The tournament is hosted and organized by the Birmingham Athletic Club, a private club in Bloomfield Hills, Michigan, and has been held each year since 1999, with the exception of 2008, when the event was moved from November to the following January.

The Motor City Open is usually scheduled immediately to follow the Tournament of Champions held in New York City.  The tournament takes place over six days. The first two days consist of a qualifying competition, where 16 competitors compete for four places in the main draw. After the qualification rounds, the four qualifiers join the 12 exempt players in the main draw.

In addition to the main draw, the Motor City Open also features a pro-am doubles competition and a clinic for juniors conducted by the professionals. The event also conducts a silent auction to raise funds for charity. In recent years, this charity has been the Barbara Ann Karmanos Cancer Institute.

Past results
Listed below are the results from the Motor City Open:

References

External links 
 Official Motor City Open website
 Birmingham Athletic Club website

Sports in Detroit
 
PSA World Tour
Annual sporting events in the United States
Annual events in Michigan
1999 establishments in Michigan
Recurring sporting events established in 1999